Pilodeudorix kohli is a butterfly in the family Lycaenidae. It is found in the Republic of the Congo, the Democratic Republic of the Congo (Sankuru and Lualaba), Uganda and north-western Tanzania.

References

Butterflies described in 1921
Deudorigini